Mauritius–Russia relations are the bilateral relations of Russia and Mauritius.

Overview
The Soviet Union and Mauritius established diplomatic relations on 17 March 1968.

The Embassy of the Russian Federation is located in Floréal, and the Embassy of the Republic of Mauritius in Moscow was opened in August 2003. The current Ambassador of Russia to Mauritius is Vyacheslav Nikiforov (Letters of Credence presented on 28 July 2011). The current Ambassador of Mauritius to Russia is Indira Savitree Thacoor Sidaya, who presented her Letters of Credence to Russian President Vladimir Putin on 23 October 2013.

See also
 Foreign relations of Russia
 Foreign relations of Mauritius

References

External links
 Посольство России в Республике Маврикий
 Embassy of Mauritius in Russia
  Documents on the Mauritius–Russia relationship by the Russian Ministry of Foreign Affairs

 
Africa–Russia relations
Bilateral relations of Mauritius
Mauritius